The Ōpāwaho / Heathcote River lies within the city boundaries of Christchurch, New Zealand, and is fed from springs near Templeton Road, with a catchment area in wet weather extending as far west as Yaldhurst and Pound Road. It meanders around the base of the Port Hills from west to south-east.

Course
The catchment of the Ōpāwaho / Heathcote River extends to the suburb of Yaldhurst. Curletts Stream, flows through an industrial part of Christchurch before joining Ōpāwaho. The Heathcote river flows through Wigram, Hillmorton (where the main springs are located), Hoon Hay (and from there around the base of the Port Hills), Spreydon, Cracroft, Cashmere, Beckenham, St Martins, Opawa, Woolston and Ferrymead.

It drains into the Avon Heathcote Estuary / Ihutai before draining into Pegasus Bay.

Pre-European settlement and naming 

The original name of this river, Ō-pā-waho means 'The Place of the Outward Pā', or 'The Outpost' and refers to this pā being an outpost (Māori: waho) of Kaiapoi. The pā was built in a higher location just downstream of the present Opawa Road Bridge. It was a resting place for Ngāi Tahu travelling between Kaiapoi and Horomaka (Banks Peninsula). The surrounding area was an important mahinga kai, a source of plentiful food, especially tuere (blind eel) and kanakana (lamprey).

The river historically meandered through extensive wetlands prior to urbanisation. Historic survey maps from the mid-19th century (known as the 'Black Maps') indicate that the habitat that the river passed through was abundant in flax (harakeke), toetoe, raupō, tutu and ferns and was dotted with tī kōuka (cabbage tree).

The river corridor was low-lying and very wet. When the Waimakariri River rose and flowed across the plains, even higher ground was prone to flooding. Over many centuries of using the river as a food source and transport corridor, the iwi of Waitaha, Kāti Māmoe and Ngāi Tahu fostered a close relationship with this resource. The swamp forest around the river provided gathering grounds for water fowl and forest birds. Traps were regularly set for inanga (whitebait), pātiki (flounder), and tuna (eel).

The original European name for the river, the Heathcote, is in honour of Sir William Heathcote, secretary of the Canterbury Association.

Management

The Ōpāwaho / Heathcote River provided Woolston plentiful water for industries like wool scouring. In 1966 the Woolston industrial sewer was built, and up until that time the river had become increasingly polluted.

Flooding had also become a problem and in 1986 the Woolston Cut began to allow flood waters to bypass a long loop of the river, known as the Woolston Loop. Extensive investigations revealed that the trees died from salt water travelling further upstream with every tide (with the salt killing the trees), that the soil structure changed (a sodium / calcium exchange in the clay molecules weakened the soils) and the Tunnelling mud crab had extended its range up the river, further weakening the banks. As a mitigating measure, the Woolston Tidal Barrage was built at the upstream end of the cut, which is only opened in time of floods. During normal flow regimes, the Heathcote remains to flow through the Woolston Loop. But despite the Woolston Cut, parts of the Ōpāwaho / Heathcote River have flooded during heavy rainfall.

During 2008, Christchurch City Council consulted on a management plan for the section of river located between Colombo Street and Opawa Road, which was formally adopted on 9 April 2009.

The water quality in the Ōpāwaho / Heathcote River is rated poorly by the Christchurch City Council in 2020. Eight of the 13 worst monitored sites in rivers or streams in Christchurch were in the Ōpāwaho / Heathcote catchment.

Work has been completed in 2021 on stormwater basins at the upper Heathcote to improve the water quality,  manage flood risk with an added benefit of providing additional recreational spaces. These include the Curletts stormwater basin and the, Wigram east basin. Work continues on the Eastman wetlands storage basins, Sutherlands storm water treatment basins and the flood storage basin in Worlsey valley near the Christchurch Adventure Park.

In the heavy rain which caused flooding across Canterbury at the end of May 2021, the Ōpāwaho / Heathcote River did not flood any houses about floor level. This was despite 127mm of rain falling over a three day period. The Christchurch City Council was pleased to see the work developing storm water basins had paid off.

Notes

References

External links

Heathcote River walks; pamphlet by Christchurch City Council

Rivers of Christchurch